The Wuest Expanded Translation (born 1961 in Professor Kenneth S. Wuest) is a literal New Testament translation that follows the word order in the Greek quite strictly.

For example, John 1:1–3 reads:

External links
WET translation
Wuest's Expanded Translation of the New Testament

1961 books
Bible translations into English
1961 in Christianity
New Testament editions